The 2013–14 Seton Hall Pirates men's basketball team represented Seton Hall University during the 2013–14 NCAA Division I men's basketball season. The Pirates, led by fourth head coach Kevin Willard, played its home games in Newark, New Jersey at the Prudential Center and are members of the newly reorganized Big East Conference. They finished the season 17–17, 6–12 in Big East play to finish in eighth place. They advanced to the semifinals of the Big East tournament where they lost to Providence.

Roster

Schedule
 
|-
!colspan=9 style="background:#005DAA; color:#D3D3D3;"| Exhibition

|-
!colspan=9 style="background:#005DAA; color:#D3D3D3;"| Regular season

|-
!colspan=9 style="background:#005DAA; color:#D3D3D3;"| Big East tournament

References

Seton Hall
Seton Hall Pirates men's basketball seasons
Seton Hall
Seton Hall